"World's End, Girl's Rondo" is the sixth single released by Japanese singer and cellist Kanon Wakeshima, and fourth single from her album, Tsukinami. The song was used as an opening for the anime Selector Spread WIXOSS. The song peaked at number 17 on the Oricon Singles Chart and stayed on the chart for six weeks.

Track listing

Personnel
 Kanon Wakeshima – Vocals, Cello, Piano, Lyrics

References 

2014 singles
2014 songs
Kanon Wakeshima songs
Warner Music Japan singles
Anime songs